Sir Allan John Heppel Ramsay  (19 October 1937 – 5 January 2022) was a British diplomat.

Biography
The son of Norman Ramsay Ramsay and wife Evelyn Faith Sorel-Cameron, Ramsay was educated at Bedford School and at the Royal Military Academy Sandhurst. At one point he also studied at Durham University.

Ramsay was in the British Army from 1957 to 1970, serving in the Somerset Light Infantry until 1964, followed by two years in the Trucial Oman Scouts, and finally joining the Durham Light Infantry for the remainder of his service. He attended MECAS from 1968 to 1969 and then joined the Foreign and Commonwealth Office in 1970.

He was British Ambassador to the Lebanon (1988–1990), British Ambassador to the Sudan (1990–1991) and British Ambassador to Morocco (1992–1996).

Ramsay died at home in France on the 5 January 2022, at the age of 84.

Honours
  Knight Commander of the Most Excellent Order of the British Empire (KBE) – 1992
  Companion of the Most Distinguished Order of St Michael and St George (CMG) – 1989

References

1937 births
2022 deaths
Place of birth missing
Alumni of Durham University
People educated at Bedford School
Graduates of the Royal Military Academy Sandhurst
Ambassadors of the United Kingdom to Lebanon
Ambassadors of the United Kingdom to Sudan
Ambassadors of the United Kingdom to Morocco
Members of HM Diplomatic Service
Companions of the Order of St Michael and St George
Knights Commander of the Order of the British Empire
20th-century British diplomats